The following is a list of episodes for the Australian television series, East West 101. The series began on 6 December 2007 and ran till 2011. 20 episodes have been aired. The series aired on the SBS network in Australia. The show is based on the New South Wales Police's Major Crimes Unit, starring Don Hany as a Muslim police officer named Detective Zane Malik and William McInnes as Anglo-Australian Detective Sergeant Ray Crowley as they investigate serious crimes in New South Wales affecting people of all races while trying to balance their lives, especially when the two officers had experienced tragic events that threatened to work against their ethics as policemen.
 
The first, second and third seasons are available on DVD. The second season was released on DVD before it began airing on SBS.

Summary

Season One (2007–2008)

Season Two (2009)

Season Three (2011)

References

Lists of Australian drama television series episodes